Pattalinus is a genus of beetles in the family Cerambycidae, containing the following species:

 Pattalinus mirificus (Gilmour, 1961)
 Pattalinus charis Bates, 1881
 Pattalinus cultus Bates, 1881
 Pattalinus griseolus Monné, 1988
 Pattalinus lineatus Monné & Martins, 1976
 Pattalinus strigosus Monné, 1988
 Pattalinus vittulatus (Gilmour, 1961)

References

Acanthocinini